Bohemisms, or Czechisms, are words and expressions borrowed or derived from the Czech language. The former term is derived from the historical name Bohemia for Czech lands.

The best known Bohemisms, entered into virtually all languages, are "robot", "polka" and "pistol". See List of English words of Czech origin for Bohemisms in English.

Many Bohemisms related to church and liturgy entered the Polish language in the Middle Ages during the Christianization of Poland, under the influence of Moravian and Bohemian traditions. Many of them ultimately originated from Latin, the language of liturgy. 

The analysis of Bohemisms is a significant argument of the Edward L. Keenan's hypothesis about the authorship of The Tale of Igor's Campaign.

See also
 Bohemistics
 Czenglish

References

Further reading
 Львов А. Чешско-моравская лексика в памятниках древнерусской письменности. Славянское языковедение. (VII сьезд славистов). М. 1968 (in Russian).
 Strumins'kyj В. A Czech Contribution to Modern Ukrainian. Canadian-American Slavic Studies, ч. 2. Темпе 1977.

Czech language
Cultural assimilation
Etymology

cs:Bohemismus